Cameron Township may refer to the following townships in the United States:

 Cameron Township, Audubon County, Iowa
 Cameron Township, Murray County, Minnesota
 Cameron Township, Hall County, Nebraska

See also 
 East Cameron Township, Northumberland County, Pennsylvania
 West Cameron Township, Northumberland County, Pennsylvania